Omar Osman Rabe was a Somali scholar, writer, politician and pan-Somalist of the former Cote Francaise des Somalis or French Somaliland and the Republic of Djibouti. He was born in Dembel in the Shinile region of Ethiopia in 1946 and died in Cairo, Egypt in 2013.

History 
Omar Osman Rabeh was raised under the French colonial rule and started his struggle against the French at an early age. He was a Somali politician and a pan-Somalist , he joined the "Parti Du Mouvement Populaire (PMP)" in 1960.

Accused of having participated in an assassination attempt against the French appointed Prime Minister, Ali Aref Bourhan on 6 May 1968, he was sentenced to death on 27 May 1968. Although on 27 November 1968 his execution sentence was commuted to life imprisonment. He was transferred in December 1968 to the "Centre de détention de Muret" in Haute-Garonne, in the region of Occitanie. in France.

After spending 7 years in the "Centre de détention de Muret" , the French jail, he was later traded for the French Ambassador to Somalia, John Gueury who was kidnapped by the "Front de libération de la Côte des Somalis" (FLCS), the French Somali Coast Liberation Front. While in jail, he achieved a PhD degree in philosophy from the University of Toulouse in 1979.

Later on he moved to Djibouti, and became the director of the "l'École normale" in 1980. He also partook in the training of the "Parti Populaire Djiboutien" (PPD) in 1981, then moved to Somalia in 1982. Eventually he moved to France and then Canada. He published his autobiography, Le Cercle et la spirale in 1984, shortly after he was stripped of his Djiboutian citizenship.

He returned to Djibouti in the 2000s, where he became a presidential adviser and head of the research center "de l'institut de géopolitique au Centre d'études et de recherche de Djibouti"  (CERD).

He devoted his time to seeking Somali unity and to educate young Somalis, in Ottawa, Canada he founded "L'ecole Ibn Battouta", a French Immersion Islamic school. The school is considered to be one of the best and serves the Muslim community. Omar Osman Rabe also authored many books and articles on Somali culture, psychology and nationalism.

His wife recounts in a series of videos posted on YouTube on October 24, 2019 how Ismail Omar Guelleh treated him in the last moments of his life. She says that Rabeh had requested that the 7 years he spent in prison in France be taken into account in his retirement pension. He received a dismissal.

Feeling tired and sick, he requested that he be evacuated out of the country. Having received no response despite occupying the position of presidential adviser and despite sending several requests for an audience with acknowledgment of receipt, he left for Cairo for treatment. During his convalescence in Cairo, his salary was suspended.

After his death, emissaries on the orders of Ismail Omar Guelleh coming in turn from the Somalia embassy in Egypt, the Djibouti embassy, Somali personalities in Egypt and even his wife's own family took turns to pressure her to organize the funeral in Djibouti dangling her a state funeral. When the body arrived at Djibouti airport, orders from Ismail Omar Guelleh came to hide it from the public eye and avoid crowds. Rabeh was buried on the sly in the greatest secrecy at the PK12 cemetery. No tribute or announcement of his death was made by the authorities in the media.

Publications 
 Le Cercle et la spirale, Paris, Les Lettres libres, 1984.
 République de Djibouti ou roue de secours d’… Éthiopie, Ivry, Ateliers Silex, 1985.
 L’État et le pansomalisme, Paris, Le Derwish, 1988.
 The Somali nation, III : the state and society, theorical considerations, Paris : Seecop, 1985.
 The Somali nation, 2 : present-day considerations and questions as the future : nomadism and technology, 1984 
 The Somali nation : historical considerations and issues for the future, Aulnay-s-bois 1983. 
 Somalia : psychology of the nomad, 1983. 
 La mentalité nomade ou l'Antinomie état/clans, Djibouti, RDD : Institut d'études politiques et stratégiques (IEPS), 2010. 
 The Somali Nomad, Hamburg, 1983 
 Examen de conscience et autocritique philosophiques : Liberté et prison, Toulouse2: 1979.

References 

History of Djibouti
Djiboutian politicians
1946 births
2013 deaths
Gadabuursi